Helene "Leni" Junker (later Thymm; 8 December 1905 – 9 February 1997) was a German sprint runner who competed at the 1928 Summer Olympics. She won a bronze medal in the 4 × 100 m, but failed to reach the final of the individual 100 m event. Earlier in 1925 she set a world record in the 100-metre at 12.2 seconds.

References
 

1905 births
1997 deaths
Athletes (track and field) at the 1928 Summer Olympics
German female sprinters
Olympic athletes of Germany
Olympic bronze medalists for Germany
Sportspeople from Kassel
People from Hesse-Nassau
Medalists at the 1928 Summer Olympics
Olympic bronze medalists in athletics (track and field)
Olympic female sprinters
20th-century German women